"Richard III" is third episode of the second series of the British television series The Hollow Crown, based on the play of the same name by William Shakespeare. It was directed by Dominic Cooke, who also adapted the screenplay with Ben Power. It starred Benedict Cumberbatch as Richard III, Sophie Okonedo as Queen Margaret and Judi Dench as Cecily. It was first broadcast on 21 May 2016 on BBC Two.

Cast

 Benedict Cumberbatch as Richard III of England
 Ben Daniels as Duke of Buckingham
 Judi Dench as Cecily, Duchess of York
 James Fleet as Lord Hastings
 Phoebe Fox as Queen Anne
 Keeley Hawes as Queen Elizabeth
 Sophie Okonedo as Queen Margaret
 Geoffrey Streatfeild as King Edward IV of England
 Luke Treadaway as King Henry VII of England
 Sam Troughton as George Plantagenet, Duke of Clarence
 Josef Altin as Murderer
 Isaac Andrews as Prince Richard, Duke of York
 Paul Bazely as Catesby
 Geoff Bell as Murderer
 Robert Bowman as Mayor of London
 Alan David as Bishop of Ely
 Keith Dunphy as Ratcliffe
 Simon Ginty as George Stanley
 Ivanno Jeremiah as Blunt
 Madison Lygo as Princess Elizabeth, marries Henry VII
 John MacKay as Brackenbury
 Caspar Morley as Prince Edward
 Gary Powell as Tyrell
 Penny Ryder as Lady-in-Waiting
 Jo Stone-Fewings as Lord Stanley
 Samuel Valentine as Lord Grey
 Al Weaver as Lord Rivers

Production

The concluding cycle of plays were produced in 2015 by the same team that made the first series and were directed by the former artistic director of Royal Court Theatre and Olivier Award winner, Dominic Cooke. They were adapted by Dominic Cooke and Ben Power.

Executive producer Pippa Harris stated, "The critical and audience reaction to The Hollow Crown series set the bar high for Shakespeare on screen, and Neal Street (Productions) is delighted to be making the concluding part of this great history cycle. By filming the ‘Henry VI’ plays as well as ‘Richard III,’ we will allow viewers to fully appreciate how such a monstrous tyrant could find his way to power, bringing even more weight and depth to this iconic character."

Once again, the production returned to Kent for The Wars of The Roses, filming at Dover Castle, Leeds Castle and Penshurst Place.

Broadcast
The second cycle of plays aired on consecutive Saturday evenings on BBC Two commencing Saturday 7 May 2016.

Home media
A Region 2 DVD set of The Wars of the Roses was released on 20 June 2016. A Region 1 DVD set was released on 21 June 2016.

Soundtrack 
The original music soundtrack from The Hollow Crown: The Wars of the Roses composed by Dan Jones was released on the Wave Theory Records label in June 2016 and performed by the BBC National Orchestra of Wales

References

External links 
 
 
 "Richard III" at Great Performances

2016 British television episodes
Works based on Richard III (play)
The Hollow Crown (TV series)